The men's 400 metres at the 1998 European Athletics Championships was held at the Népstadion on 19, 20 and 21 August.

Medalists

Results

Round 1
Qualification: First 3 in each heat (Q) and the next 4 fastest (q) advance to the Semifinals.

Semifinals
Qualification: First 4 in each heat (Q)  advance to the Final.

Final

References

Results
Results
Results

400
400 metres at the European Athletics Championships